Ariz is a station on line 2 of the Bilbao metro. The station is located in the municipality of Basauri. It was opened in 2011.

History 

It was opened on 28 February 2011, being the first metro station in the municipality of Basauri, the other one being Basauri station, which was opened on 11 November that same year. During the first day, more than 8,000 passengers used the new station.

Until the opening of Basauri station, both lines 1 and 2 reached Ariz; starting on November 11 only line 2 uses it. Line 1 now terminates at Etxebarri.

Station layout 

Ariz station follows the typical cavern-shaped layout of most underground Metro Bilbao stations, with the main hall located directly above the rail tracks.

Access 

  Nagusia St. (Nagusia exit)
  Valencia St. (Valencia exit, closed during night time services)
  León St.

Services 
The station is served by line 2 from Kabiezes to Basauri with headways from five to ten minutes. Bus stops near the station are served by Bizkaibus regional services.

References

External links
 

Line 2 (Bilbao metro) stations
Railway stations in Spain opened in 2011
2011 establishments in the Basque Country (autonomous community)